Paul Ian Biran (born 25 February 1969) is an Israeli mathematician. He holds a chair at ETH Zurich. His research interests include symplectic geometry and algebraic geometry.

Education
Born in Romania in 1969, Biran's family moved to Israel in 1971. He attended Tel Aviv University, where he earned his Bachelor's degree in 1994 and Ph.D. in 1997 under supervision of Leonid Polterovich (thesis: Geometry of Symplectic Packing).

Career 
From 1997 to 1999, Biran was a "Szego Assistant Professor" at Stanford University. At Tel Aviv University, he was a lecturer from 1997 to 2001, a senior lecturer from 2001 to 2005, an associate professor in 2005, and a full professor in 2008. In 2009, Biran became a full professor of mathematics at ETH Zurich.

Awards
Biran was awarded the Oberwolfach Prize in 2003, the EMS Prize in 2004, and the Erdős Prize in 2006. In 2013 he became a member of the German Academy of Sciences Leopoldina.

Publications

See also
Nagata–Biran conjecture

References

External links
Website at Tel-Aviv University

1969 births
Living people
Romanian Jews
Romanian emigrants to Israel
21st-century Israeli mathematicians
Tel Aviv University alumni
Academic staff of ETH Zurich
Algebraic geometers
Members of the German Academy of Sciences Leopoldina
Scientists from Bucharest
Erdős Prize recipients